Bauer is a play by Lauren Gunderson that had its world premiere in March 2014 at the San Francisco Playhouse which also commissioned it. Based on the life of the German painter Rudolf Bauer, it tells the story of how, after having arrived to USA in the beginning of World War II, he was tricked by the fellow German artist and love of his life, Hilla von Rebay, into signing a contract that gave Solomon R. Guggenheim the legal rights to all of his paintings and any future works he created. The play triggered a retrospective of Bauer's work at the Weinstein Gallery in San Francisco.

Plot 

Art has been defined as freedom of expression. People have argued that painting should hold no boundaries, no musts and don'ts but simply put into colors and shapes anything that flashes through a mind. Bauer deals with these themes and these following questions: what happens in the collision between the need for the artful substantiation of thoughts and ideas, and the earthly materialistic notion of money? For whom is art created and what happens when the artist is no longer the owner of his art? These questions that are presented through the 90 minutes of animated dialogue that constitutes this play. The characters slowly work through the troubles of money and art as a business as well as the personal problems and dilemmas of their past and present lives.

Bauer is the story of a painter who does not want to paint, the despair it brings on him and his wife. The latter's bold decision to try to make things right by bringing in a lost love, with whom Bauer has unresolved issues after her involvement in making Bauer sign the contract from which all his unhappiness springs. Starring only three actors this play proceeds into the depths of greed, betrayal, love and the freedom of painting, but also the freedom of refusing to do so.

Characters 
 Rudolf Bauer: The tortured title character who battles the urge to paint with the feeling of not being able to do so because of the position he is in of no longer owning what he creates.
 Louise Bauer: Bauer's caring wife who in a last desperate attempt to make her husband paint again invites his ex-lover Hilla Rebay to their home.
 Hilla Rebay: Bauer's long gone German lover who started a relationship with Guggenheim and made Bauer sign the contract giving up his art.

Original cast 
 Ronald Guttman as Rudolf Bauer
 Stacy Ross as Hilla Rebay
 Susi Damilano as Louise Bauer

References

External links
Profile of Rudolf Bauer by Karole Veil, Solomon R. Guggenheim Museum
Bauer official website, San Francisco Playhouse

2014 plays
American plays
Plays based on real people
Plays set in the 19th century
Plays set in the 20th century
Cultural depictions of 19th-century painters
Cultural depictions of 20th-century painters
Cultural depictions of German men
Biographical plays about painters
Plays set in California
San Francisco in fiction